Deolinda Fonseca  (born 1954 in Porto) is a Portuguese painter who since 1979 has primarily worked in Denmark. She is regarded for her oil paintings of mostly abstract themes with hints of realistic images. She also paints portraits, in which she combines realistic representation with abstract expressionism.

Her work is characterized by the kind of expressionism that oscillates between abstraction and figuration, an expressionism that connects the abstract pictorial depths, with a subtle disperse figuration.

"The paintings of Deolinda Fonseca are synthesized in these three movements that together configure three worlds: one that planes over the painting itself, another that drifts away towards it, and another that exists over here."

Sinne Lundgaard Rasmussen, a Danish writer on art, has praised the "strength" of her paintings, saying that "Painter and paint meet in the painting, and this is where we find Deolinda Fonseca."

Fonseca graduated as a painter and sculptor at Faculdade de Belas-Artes do Porto in 1979, and she has lived in Denmark since then.
In 2002, she received Portugal's medal of honor, the "Order of Prince Henry" (in Portuguese, "Ordem do Infante D. Henrique"), a type of knighthood. She has exhibited throughout Denmark and Portugal, as well as in other European countries, and her work is displayed in museums, embassies and private collections in Europe and the United States.

References

Sources
Based in part on a translation of an entry to Deolinda Fonseca in the Portuguese Wikipedia

External links
 Official website
 Selection of Deolinda Fonseca paintings on ArtNet
 Art exhibit in Miami, 2011

Living people
1954 births
Portuguese painters
Artists from Porto
Portuguese women painters
University of Porto alumni
20th-century Portuguese women artists
21st-century Portuguese women artists